The 1985–86 season was FC Dinamo București's 37th season in Divizia A. This was the season when it started the Lucescu era for Dinamo. Mircea Lucescu was brought as manager in the 14th round. He won his first trophy at the end of the season, the Romanian Cup, beating Steaua in the final, the team that just became European champions.

In the championship, Dinamo started badly, and continued that way, ending only fourth. The results were not good in the European competitions either. In the UEFA Cup, Dinamo was eliminated in the first round, by the Yugoslavian side Vardar Skopje.

In the game versus FC Bihor, in the 33rd round, the assistant manager Florin Cheran, was introduced in the team because of the medical problems in the squad. Cheran was 39 years old and ended his football career four years before.

Results

Romanian Cup final

UEFA Cup 

First round

FK Vardar Skopje won 2-2 on aggregate due to away goals

Squad 

Goalkeepers: Dumitru Moraru, Constantin Eftimescu, Florin Prunea, Ioan Bucu.

Defenders: Mircea Rednic, Ioan Andone, Alexandru Nicolae, Nelu Stănescu, Vasile Jercălău, Iulian Mihăescu, Ioan Varga, Virgil Mitici, Dan Topolinschi, Niculae Ivan.

Midfielders: Ionel Augustin, Marin Dragnea, Lică Movilă, Ioan Zare, Daniel Sava, Alexandru Suciu.

Forwards: Marian Damaschin, Costel Orac, Gheorghe Tulba, Sorin Răducanu, Nistor Văidean, Florin Răducioiu.

Transfers 

Dinamo brought Nistor Văidean (FCM Brașov), Marian Damaschin (Poli Iași). Cornel Țălnar is transferred to FCM Brașov, Nicușor Vlad, Teofil Stredie and Ionel Augustin to Victoria București. Vasile Jercălău, Florin Răducioiu and Florin Prunea make their debuts.

References 
 www.labtof.ro
 www.romaniansoccer.ro

1985
Romanian football clubs 1985–86 season